Cojoba rufescens is a species of flowering plant in the family Fabaceae. It is found in Colombia, Costa Rica, Ecuador, and Panama.

References

Mimosoids
Neotropical realm flora
Least concern plants
Taxonomy articles created by Polbot